The 1964 Massachusetts gubernatorial election was held on November 3, 1964. Incumbent Governor Endicott Peabody ran for re-election, but was defeated by then-Lieutenant Governor Francis X. Bellotti in the Democratic Party primary. Bellotti went on to lose the general election to former Governor John Volpe.

The race between Volpe and Bellotti was the first time in Massachusetts history that the two major parties backed sons of Italian immigrants for governor.

This was the final election held before the governor's term of office was extended from two to four years.

Democratic primary

Candidates
Francis Bellotti, Lieutenant Governor
Pasquale Caggiano, perennial candidate
John Droney, Middlesex County District Attorney
Endicott Peabody, incumbent Governor

Declined
Robert F. Kennedy, U.S. Attorney General (brother of President John F. Kennedy)

Results

Republican primary

Candidates
John Volpe, former Governor

Results
Volpe ran unopposed in the Republican primary.

General election

Results
Volpe defeated Bellotti by less than 25,000 votes. Volpe's victory came in a year in which Democrats gained seats in the United States House of Representatives and Senate and Lyndon Johnson won the Presidential election in a landslide.

See also
 1963–1964 Massachusetts legislature

References

1964
Massachusetts
Gubernatorial
November 1964 events in the United States